Mr Bigg's is one of Nigeria's fast food restaurants. Owned by Nigerian conglomerate United African Company of Nigeria PLC, there are currently around 170 locations in Nigeria, including the country's first drive-through restaurant, with another four locations in Ghana. In 2013, Famous Brands, South Africa, bought a 49% stake in the chain.

The restaurant is known for its red and yellow colour scheme and meat pies. Mr Bigg's history begins with the coffee shops inside Kingsway Department Stores in the 1960s. In 1973, these shops were rebranded as Kingsway Rendezvous, which became Mr Bigg's in 1986. The chain saw rapid expansion after becoming one of the first Nigerian companies to sell franchises to investors.

References

External links 
 Official site
 Corporate website - UAC Restaurants

Fast-food franchises
Fast-food chains of Nigeria
Restaurants in Lagos
Restaurants established in 1973
Nigerian companies established in 1973